Werner Mieth (born April 28, 1912 in Meissen, Germany; died September 28, 1997 in Union, New Jersey) was a German-American football (soccer) halfback.  He is a member of the National Soccer Hall of Fame.  He spent most of his career in the American Soccer League and the German American Soccer League.

Mieth began his career in Germany as a junior player with Coswig.  In 1925, he moved to the United States where he joined the junior team of the Newark Germans which competed in the German American Soccer League.  He eventually found a place with the Americans’ first team as it won the 1931, 1932 and 1932 GASL titles.  In 1933, Newark joined the American Soccer League.  Mieth moved to McDonough S.C. in 1935 and to the Kearny Irish in 1937.  He remained there for only one season before switching to the Trenton Highlanders for the 1938–1939 season and the Paterson Dovers for the 1939–1940 season.  In 1940, Mieth joined the Philadelphia German-Americans where he spent the next twelve seasons.  The German-Americans were renamed the Americans in 1941, winning the ASL championship in 1942, 1944, 1947, 1948 and 1952.  In 1953, Uhrick Trucking purchased the team, renaming the team the Uhrik Truckers.  In 1954, Truckers released Mieth and he moved to the Elizabeth Falcons.  In 1962, he moved to the Westfield Lions which played in the Italian League.  At some point, he returned to the Newark Germans.

External links
 National Soccer Hall of Fame profile

1912 births
1997 deaths
People from Meissen
American Soccer League (1933–1983) players
American soccer players
Elizabeth Falcons players
German footballers
German emigrants to the United States
German-American Soccer League players
National Soccer Hall of Fame members
Newark Germans players
Kearny Irish players
Uhrik Truckers players
Trenton Highlanders players
Association football wing halves
Footballers from Saxony